Actia pilipennis is a Palearctic species of fly in the family Tachinidae.

Distribution
France, Ireland, United Kingdom, Hungary, Sweden, Russia, Mongolia, Japan.

Hosts
Choreutidae, Oecophoridae, Pterolonchidae, Tortricidae & Gelechiidae.

References

pilipennis
Muscomorph flies of Europe
Diptera of Asia
Insects described in 1810